Zombieland: Double Tap is a 2019 American post-apocalyptic zombie comedy film directed by Ruben Fleischer and written by Rhett Reese, Paul Wernick, and David Callaham. The sequel to Zombieland (2009), it stars an ensemble cast including Woody Harrelson, Jesse Eisenberg, Abigail Breslin, Emma Stone, Rosario Dawson, Zoey Deutch, Avan Jogia, Luke Wilson, and Thomas Middleditch. In the film, Tallahassee (Harrelson), Columbus (Eisenberg), and Wichita (Stone) face evolved zombies and encounter other survivors as they travel from the White House to Graceland to search for Little Rock (Breslin).

A sequel to the original film began development in November 2009, with the returns of Reese, Wernick, Fleischer and the main cast planned. It soon faced several delays, and the writers instead wrote a Zombieland television pilot in 2013 featuring a new cast, which ultimately failed in being ordered for a series release. Development for the sequel film was revived in February 2016, the screenplay was completed in March 2017, and the film was confirmed in July 2018. The rest of the cast was rounded out under a year later, and principal photography began in January 2019 and concluded that March, with filming primarily taking place in Atlanta.  

Zombieland: Double Tap premiered in Los Angeles on October 10, 2019, was theatrically released in the United States on October 18, by Sony Pictures Releasing. It received mostly positive reviews from critics, who found it to be a worthwhile successor to the original and praised the cast performances. The film grossed $125 million worldwide, becoming the highest grossing Zombieland film. A sequel film is widely rumored, although no announcement has been made by the filmmakers.

Plot
Six years after the outbreak, Tallahassee, Columbus, Wichita, and Little Rock encounter new strains of zombies: "Homers" (slow and do not feed), "Hawkings" (psychologically developed), and "Ninjas" (those that hide prior to attacking). 

Living in the White House, Tallahassee rebuffs Little Rock's hopes of searching for other survivors, while Columbus proposes to Wichita. The day after they celebrate Christmas, Tallahassee finds a note from the girls, revealing they took off in a weaponized version of The Beast. A month later, while exploring a mall, Columbus and Tallahassee meet Madison, who survived the apocalypse hiding in a Pinkberry store. Columbus and Madison have sex at the White House and are discovered by Wichita, who reveals Little Rock stole The Beast and left for Graceland with Berkeley, a mysterious pacifist.

Fearing for Little Rock's safety, the group head to Graceland. Attempting to switch cars, they fight off a horde of zombies, leading to Madison being scratched on the foot by a "Ninja" and being saved by Columbus. The last zombie in the bunch is labelled "T-800": a strain which takes multiple gunshots to kill. Retreating to their car, Madison appears to turn into a zombie; this forces them to pull over, and Columbus decides to lead her into the forest and kill her.

The trio arrive at a ruined Graceland, without sign of Little Rock, Berkeley, and The Beast. They discover The Beast at a nearby Elvis-themed motel and meet Nevada, who reveals Little Rock and Berkeley took another vehicle to Babylon, a hippie commune. Nevada and Tallahassee spend the night together. The next morning, The Beast is crushed by a monster truck owned by Albuquerque and Flagstaff, who share history with Nevada. They then encounter several T-800s, leading to Albuquerque and Flagstaff being bit and ultimately killed by Tallahassee and Columbus.

While traveling to Babylon, they encounter Madison driving an ice cream truck heading in the same direction. She explains her nut allergy caused symptoms similar to zombification, and that Columbus spared her life by shooting above her head to scare her off. Arriving in Babylon, the group give up their weapons and find Little Rock and Berkeley. As Tallahassee departs, he sees a horde of T-800s drawn to the commune's fireworks and devises a plan to kill them: using exploding biodiesel, he tells the commune, armed with barricade shields, to corral the zombies off of a nearby skyscraper, with himself as the bait.

With the exploding biodiesel ineffective, the commune is overwhelmed until Nevada arrives in Albuquerque's truck, rescuing them. They take out several zombies, causing the vehicle to roll over. Escaping to the skyscraper, they corral the zombies off the roof. Tallahassee uses a construction crane hook to dangle out of reach, but a zombie seizes his leg as it falls. Little Rock shoots the zombie and rescues him. The group then reconcile: Wichita accepts Columbus' proposal, while Madison and Berkeley get together, as do Nevada and Tallahassee. The original quartet, including Nevada, then depart Babylon. 

In a mid-credits scene, set at the start of the outbreak, Bill Murray witnesses Al Roker turn into a zombie during a promotional interview. He kills several zombies, including Grace Randolph and Lili Estefan, and escapes. In a post-credits scene, an outtake is shown of Murray making Estefan break character by trying to cough up a hairball.

The rules 

Continuing the rules from Zombieland, Columbus' list of 73 rules includes:

Flagstaff's commandments or rules for staying alive:

Tallahassee considers adding a rule of his own: "It takes a real man to drive a pink Cadillac"

Madison's rule for surviving Zombieland: "Mostly stay in the freezer."

Cast 

 Woody Harrelson as Tallahassee, Columbus' trusted partner
 Jesse Eisenberg as Columbus, who survives thanks to a strict set of rules
 Emma Stone as Wichita, a hardened survivor who is reluctant to settle down with Columbus
 Abigail Breslin as Little Rock, Wichita's rebellious younger sister
 Rosario Dawson as Nevada, owner of an Elvis-themed motel
 Zoey Deutch as Madison, a dumb blonde
 Luke Wilson as Albuquerque, Flagstaff's partner whose personality mirrors Tallahassee
 Avan Jogia as Berkeley, a pacifist, whom Little Rock picks up
 Thomas Middleditch as Flagstaff, Albuquerque's partner who has his own set of commandments for survival, and whose personality mirrors Columbus’

A mid-credits scene features Bill Murray being interviewed by Al Roker, Lili Estefan, Josh Alex Horowitz, and Grace Randolph in the final minutes before the Zombie apocalypse hits them.

Production

Development 
After Zombieland success, writers Rhett Reese and Paul Wernick soon planned a possible sequel, with many more ideas they wanted to explore. "We would love it, and everybody involved creatively wants to do another one," Wernick said in 2009. "Woody Harrelson came up to us after the final cut of the last scene and gave us a hug and said, 'I've never wanted to do a sequel in the previous movies I've done until this one.'''" Wernick said he wanted to have Jesse Eisenberg, Harrelson, Emma Stone, and Abigail Breslin star again, with Ruben Fleischer returning as the director, and that the writers had "tons of new ideas swimming in their heads." Additionally, they wanted to make the comedy into an enduring franchise. "We would love to do several sequels," stated Wernick. "We would love to also see it on television. It would make a wonderful TV series." From this, they wrote a TV pilot, starring a different cast, released in April 2013 on Lovefilm and Amazon Video.

At the time of the first film's release, Reese and Wernick said they were not planning on an immediate sequel, due to being heavily involved with other writing projects. By November 2009, the original cast and director were all set to return, with Fleischer enthusiastic about the idea of making the sequel in 3D. In 2010, Fleischer stated that he was working on the screenplay, and the creators had begun searching for another "superstar cameo".

In July 2011, Eisenberg said that he was "not sure what's happening" with the sequel, but that the writers were working on Zombieland 2. He also expressed concern that a sequel would no longer be "relevant". Harrelson said that he was hesitant to return for a sequel as well, adding, "It's one thing to do it when it came out real good and it made a lot of people laugh, but then do a sequel? I don't know. I don't feel like a sequels guy."

In February 2016, the project was officially revived, with Reese and Wernick again set to write the script. In August 2016, Reese and Wernick confirmed that they were working on Zombieland 2 and meeting with Woody Harrelson to discuss the film, while stating "all the cast is pretty excited."

In March 2017, it was revealed that the script for Zombieland 2 had been completed, with Wernick and Reese stating: 

In May 2018, Harrelson said that he hoped the film would be in production by early 2019, and that it would be released in time for the original's tenth anniversary.

 Pre-production 
On July 13, 2018, Zombieland: Double Tap was officially greenlit by Sony Pictures. Ruben Fleischer returned to direct while Eisenberg, Harrelson, Stone and Breslin reprised their roles. Sanford Panitch, president of Columbia Pictures, declared in a press release: 

In November 2018, Zoey Deutch and Avan Jogia joined the cast. In December 2018, it was confirmed that Bill Murray would return for the sequel, once again playing the fictionalized version of himself. In January 2019, Rosario Dawson joined the cast of the film. Thomas Middleditch and Luke Wilson joined in February.

 Filming 
Filming began on January 19, 2019, in Atlanta, Georgia. Primary production finished on March 15, 2019. The building used for the Babylon commune is located in Atlanta near the spaghetti junction. It was used for a hotel for many years, and is now abandoned. The film was also shot at Pinewood Atlanta Studios.

 Release 
The film was released in the United States on October 18, 2019. Worldwide, Sony spent about $60 million on prints and advertising for the film.

Home mediaZombieland: Double Tap was released on Digital HD on December 24, 2019, and on DVD, Blu-ray, and Ultra HD Blu-ray on January 21, 2020. The film grossed $16.6 million in home sales.

Reception
Box officeZombieland: Double Tap grossed $73.1 million in the United States and Canada, and $52.1 million in other territories, for a worldwide total of $125.2 million.

In the United States and Canada, the film was released alongside Maleficent: Mistress of Evil, and was projected to gross $25–30 million from 3,468 theaters in its opening weekend. The film made $10.2 million on its first day, including $2.85 million from Thursday night previews. It went on to debut to $26.8 million, finishing third, behind Maleficent and Joker. It then dropped 56% in its second weekend to $11.8 million, finishing fourth, and made $7.4 million in its third weekend, finishing sixth.

Critical response
The site's critical consensus reads, "Zombieland: Double Tap makes up for a lack of fresh brains with an enjoyable reunion that recaptures the spirit of the original and adds a few fun twists." On Metacritic, the film has a weighted average score of 56 out of 100, based on 37 critics, indicating "mixed or average reviews". Audiences polled by CinemaScore gave the film an average grade of "B+" on an A+ to F scale, down from the "A−" received by the first film, while those surveyed at PostTrak gave it four out of five stars and a 64% "definite recommend".

Richard Roeper of the Chicago Sun-Times praised the performances, saying "They're all terrific, but Emma Stone in particular kills with a sharply honed, funny and endearing performance as the battle-tested and cynical Wichita, who is fearless when it comes to taking on zombies, but terrified when it comes to fully committing to a human connection." Simon Thompson at IGN also praises the acting, writing, "Zombieland: Double Tap is a riot, and a lot of that is due to Zoey Deutch and her character, Madison. While it doesn't quite achieve classic status in its own right, when it comes to sequels that do the original film justice, it is up there. It's worth the wait, your time and your money."

Kate Erbland of IndieWire gave the film a "C+", saying, "Zombieland: Double Tap still finds space for big laughs (the pairing of Eisenberg and Harrelson remains nutty and fun), a welcome cameo in the credits, and a banger of a final battle in which the body count soars to ridiculous numbers. But, after 10 years of anticipation, it would have been nice to see a zombie movie with more on its mind than the same goofy undead routine." Peter Debruge of Variety wrote, "The zombies have evolved[...] the comedy not so much," and, "Here, humor turns every kill into a sick punchline, and while the writers do a fine job of making them funny, like macabre cartoons in which Wile E. Coyote can rebound from unthinkable injuries, the movie’s tone negates a fundamental respect for human life. Yeah, yeah, it’s just a movie, you say. But like the first-person-shooter video games the film’s Double Tap title references, society can’t just passively sit back and accept an attitude that mocks pacifism and makes light of such extreme violence. Or else we’re the zombies, and the joke’s on us."

 Other media 
 Video games 
A mobile game, titled Zombieland: Double Tapper, was released along with the film, featuring the characters.

The film also inspired a twin-stick shooter video game titled Zombieland: Double Tap – Road Trip. Developed by High Voltage Software and published by GameMill Entertainment and Maximum Games in North America and Europe respectively, it was released on October 15, 2019, for Microsoft Windows, Nintendo Switch, PlayStation 4, and Xbox One, three days before the film's US release.

On Metacritic, the PlayStation 4 version of Zombieland: Double Tap – Road Trip received a score of 39% based on 5 reviews, indicating "generally unfavorable" reviews.

 Halloween Horror Nights Zombieland: Double Tap was featured as a scare zone at Universal Studios Florida's Halloween Horror Nights.'' The zone included the modified presidential limousine "Beast" as seen in the film.

Future

Sequel and Spin-off
During the press tour for the film, the director, writers, and cast have all stated an interest in reuniting every 10 years to do a Zombieland film. Director Ruben Fleischer said, "I think we all had so much fun making this one, we’d be really lucky to get to return to Zombieland. Although, I will say, Emma Stone said she thought it would be fun if we did one of these every 10 years. Knowing that Woody Harrelson’s just the healthiest guy there is, he’s going to outlive all of us, and so we can just keep doing them every 10 years, ‘til the end of time. … I can’t imagine a better way to look forward to my future than knowing that every 10 years I get to hang out with those guys and make a movie with them again."

In another interview, Fleischer said, "I would love to do a Madison stand-alone movie."

As of January 2023, there has been no official confirmation of a sequel and/or spin-off. But, the cast and crew continue to remain optimistic about the future of the franchise.

References

External links 
 
 

2019 films
2019 action comedy films
2019 comedy horror films
2010s action horror films
2010s adventure comedy films
2010s buddy comedy films
2010s comedy road movies
2010s monster movies
American zombie films
American zombie comedy films
American action comedy films
American action horror films
American adventure comedy films
American buddy comedy films
American comedy road movies
American sequel films
Columbia Pictures films
2010s English-language films
Films about viral outbreaks
Films directed by Ruben Fleischer
Films scored by David Sardy
Films set in 2019
Films set in Memphis, Tennessee
Films set in Pisa
Films set in Washington, D.C.
Films set in the White House
Films shot at Pinewood Atlanta Studios
Films shot in Atlanta
Films with screenplays by David Callaham
Films with screenplays by Paul Wernick
Films with screenplays by Rhett Reese
Adventure horror films
Hippie films
Parodies of horror
American post-apocalyptic films
Zombieland (franchise)
Cultural depictions of Elvis Presley
2010s American films